Besides is a B-Sides & rarities record by Bleu with unreleased songs from "A Watched Pot" and "Four". Besides was released on vinyl, CD and digital.

There are two editions, a blue 150g vinyl (limited with 100 copies) which will be signed and a black 150g vinyl (limited with 300 copies).

Track listing

Vinyl

SIDE - B
 Take Cover
 When The Other Shoe Falls
 No Such Thing As Love [Original Version]
 Can't Be That Bad (If It Feels This Good)
 The Blame Game
 How Blue [Acoustic Mix]
 When The Dog Day Comes

SIDE - Be (sides)
 If
 Blow Up The Radio
 A Watched Pot
 Mailman's Son
 In Love With My Lover [Demo]
 Save It For A Rainy Day

Digital download (with the vinyl package)

 Take Cover
 When The Other Shoe Falls
 No Such Thing As Love [Original Version]
 Can't Be That Bad (If It Feels This Good)
 The Blame Game
 Don't Take It Personally
 How Blue [Acoustic Mix]
 If...
 When The Dog Day Comes
 Blow Up The Radio
 A Watched Pot
 Mailman's Son
 In Love With My Lover [Demo]
 Save It For A Rainy Day

References

2011 albums
Bleu (musician) albums